Jacob ben Samuel Taitazak was a Talmudist of the 16th century, and an author of a responsum inserted in Samuel de Medina's collection entitled She'elot u-Teshubot MaHRaSHDaM (vol. iii., § 203, Salonica, 1598). He was a member of the Taitazak family.

References 

Talmudists
Jews from Thessaloniki
16th-century Jews from the Ottoman Empire